Yuko Hara (原 由子 Hara Yūko, born December 11, 1956 in Yokohama, Japan, nicknamed "Harabo") is the keyboardist for Southern All Stars. She is also a vocalist and writes many of her own songs.

She is married to Keisuke Kuwata, the multi-instrumentalist frontman for the Southern All-Stars, and bandleader of the Kuwata band. Together, they have two sons. Her parents' home is a tempura restaurant in Yokohama.

Discography

Original albums
 (1981)
Miss Yokohamadult Yuko Hara 2nd (1983)
Mother (1991)

Compilation albums
Loving You (1998)
 (2010)

Cover albums
 (2002)

Singles
 (1981)
 (1981)
 (1982)
 (1983)
 (1983)
 (1987)
 (1988)
 (1988)
 (1988)
 (1990) (with Inamura Orchestra)
 (1991)
 (1991)
 (1991)
 (1997) (with Shingo Katori)
 (1997)
 (2007) (as Harafūmi, with Fūmidō)
 (2009)

Radio Drama
Dr.Slump(1981)-She voiced Arale.

References

Japanese keyboardists
Southern All Stars members
1956 births
Living people
Aoyama Gakuin University alumni
People from Yokohama
Musicians from Kanagawa Prefecture
Amuse Inc. talents